Educational Technology & Society is a quarterly peer-reviewed open-access academic journal covering educational technology that was established in 1998. It is published by the  National Taiwan Normal University on behalf of the International Forum of Educational Technology & Society. The editors-in-chief are Maiga Chang (Athabasca University), Andreas Harrer (Dortmund University of Applied Sciences and Arts), Yu-Ju Lan (National Taiwan Normal University), and Yu-Fen Yang (National Yunlin University of Science and Technology). The journal has no article processing charges.

Abstracting and indexing
The journal is abstracted and indexed in:
Current Contents/Social and Behavioral Sciences
EBSCO databases
ERIC
Inspec
PsycINFO
Scopus
Social Sciences Citation Index
According to the Journal Citation Reports, the journal has a 2021 impact factor of 2.633.

References

External links
 

Educational technology journals
Creative Commons Attribution-licensed journals
Publications established in 1998
Quarterly journals
Academic journals published by learned and professional societies
English-language journals